Banitsa ( - Karié, Bulgarian/Macedonian: Баница, Banitsa or Banica, Ottoman Turkish: بانيچه Turkish Baniçe) is a deserted former village in Serres regional unit, northern Greece. Its ruins are situated some 15 km north-east of the town of Serres, near the present-day village of Oreini, on the southern slopes of the Vrontous mountains. During the Ottoman period it had a Bulgarian population. The village was destroyed  by the Greek Army during the Second Balkan War, and the population migrated to Bulgaria. Its inhabitants settled in Mehomiya, Bachevo, Nevrokop, Sveti Vrach, and Novo Delchevo.

Banitsa was the site of the death of the Macedonian Bulgarian revolutionary Gotse Delchev, who was killed in a skirmish with Ottoman police forces on 4 May 1903.

References

Balkan Wars
Macedonia under the Ottoman Empire
Serres (regional unit)
Ruins in Greece
Destroyed towns
Former populated places in Greece